50 (fifty) is the natural number following 49 and preceding 51.

In mathematics
Fifty is the smallest number that is the sum of two non-zero square numbers in two distinct ways: 50 = 12 + 72 = 52 + 52. It is also the sum of three squares, 50 = 32 + 42 + 52, and the sum of four squares, 50 = 62 + 32 + 22 + 12. It is a Harshad number.

50 is a Stirling number of the first kind:  and also a Narayana number: 

There is no solution to the equation φ(x) = 50, making 50 a nontotient. Nor is there a solution to the equation x − φ(x) = 50, making 50 a noncototient.

In science
 The atomic number of tin
 The fifth magic number in nuclear physics

In religion
 In Kabbalah, there are 50 Gates of Wisdom (or Understanding) and 50 Gates of Impurity
 The traditional number of years in a jubilee period.
 The Christian Feast of Pentecost takes place on the 50th day of the Easter Season
 The Jewish Pentecost takes place 50 days after the Passover feast (the holiday of Shavuoth).
 In Hindu tantric tradition, the number 50 holds significance as the 50 Rudras in the Malinīvijayottara correlate with the 50 phonemes of Sanskrit, as well as with the 50 severed heads worn around goddess Kalis head. The mantra Aham ("I am"), as laid out in the Vijñāna Bhairava represents the first अ(a) and last ह(ha) phonemes of the Sanskrit alphabet and is believed to represent ultimate reality, in accordance with its non-dual philosophy.

In sports
 In cricket one day internationals, each side may bat for 50 overs.

In other fields
Fifty is:
 There are 50 states in the United States of America.
 The TV show Hawaii Five-O and its reimagined version, Hawaii Five-0, are so called because Hawaii is the last  (50th) of the states to officially become a state.
 5-O (Five-Oh) - Slang for police officers and/or a warning that police are approaching. Derived from the television show Hawaii Five-O
 A calibre of ammunition (0.50 inches: see .50 BMG)
 In millimetres, the focal length of the normal lens in 35 mm photography
 The percentage (50%) equivalent to one half, so that the phrase "fifty-fifty"  commonly expresses something divided equally in two; in business this is often denoted as being the ultimate in equal partnership
 In years of marriage, the gold or "golden" wedding anniversary
 The speed limit, in kilometres per hour, of Australian and Canadian roads with unspecified limits.

See also
 List of highways numbered 50

References

Integers